"Clap Back" is a song by American rapper Ja Rule, released as the only single from his fifth studio album, Blood in My Eye (2003). It was produced by American producer Scott Storch, who helped write the song along with Ja Rule and Irv Gotti. In the United States, the song was released along with "The Crown" (featuring Sizzla) from Blood in My Eye, and outside the United States the song was released along with "Murder Reigns", the final single from Ja Rule's previous studio album The Last Temptation (2002).

The song is a diss track directed at 50 Cent and Eminem, with lines such as "Like Bush and Saddam, I'm-a find out where Em Laden's hiding and bomb him first", "And God gave me his blessings to handle my business, All these wanksta snitches, let the nina blow kisses, If she some how misses, he gon' meet the mistress, And 'Clap that boy' like Birdman and Clipse". Another line, "Fuck the Dog, beware of Rule, 'cause I'm the problem", was also interpreted as being aimed at DMX.. The song is the origin of the popular slang 'clap back' in street lingo meaning to respond or retaliate to personal attack or criticism.

Video 
The video features a snippet of "The Crown" in the beginning and then switches to "Clap Back". Benzino, Hussein Fatal and various Murder Inc artists appear.

Track listing 
US CD single

 "Clap Back" (Radio Edit) – 4:16
 "Clap Back" (Album Version) – 4:57
 "The Crown" (featuring Sizzla) (Radio Edit) – 3:45
 "Clap Back" (Video) – 5:33

Charts

References 

2003 singles
Ja Rule songs
Song recordings produced by Scott Storch
Songs written by Ja Rule
Songs written by Scott Storch
Gangsta rap songs
Diss tracks
2003 songs
Def Jam Recordings singles